Vasilije Radenović (born 10 May 1994) is a Montenegrin footballer who plays for Montenegrin 1st Division club FK Jezero.

Career
In January 2021, Radenović joined Serbian club Jagodina for the remainder of the 2020–21 season. He made his league debut for the club in February, in a 0–0 draw with former club Žarkovo.

References

External links

1994 births
Living people
Footballers from Podgorica
Association football fullbacks
Montenegrin footballers
FK BSK Borča players
FK Kolubara players
OFK Titograd players
FK Lovćen players
FK Dečić players
FK Proleter Novi Sad players
OFK Žarkovo players
FK Brodarac players
FK Jezero players
Serbian SuperLiga players
Serbian First League players
Montenegrin First League players
Montenegrin expatriate footballers
Expatriate footballers in Germany
Montenegrin expatriate sportspeople in Germany